The 1955 Basque Pelota World Championships were the 2nd edition of the Basque Pelota World Championships, organized by  the FIPV.

Participating nations

Events
A total of 12 events were disputed, in 4 playing areas.

Trinquete, 4 events disputed

Fronton (30 m), 2 events disputed

Fronton (36 m), 4 events disputed

Fronton (54 m), 2 events disputed

Medal table

References

World Championships,1955
Sport in Montevideo
1955 in Uruguayan sport
International sports competitions hosted by Uruguay
World Championships,1955
World Championships